Chancaybaños District is one of eleven districts of the province Santa Cruz in Peru.

Places of interest
 Chancaybaños Reserved Zone

References